Paracossulus thrips is a species of moth of the family Cossidae. It is found in Hungary, Romania, Ukraine, Russia, Kazakhstan and Turkey. The habitat consists of exclaves of open steppe vegetation on sands or loess and xerophilous grasslands on alkaline substrates.

The larvae bore the roots of Artemisia species.

References

Moths described in 1818
Cossinae
Moths of Europe
Moths of Asia